The 1957 NASCAR Grand National Series saw driver Buck Baker win his second consecutive NASCAR Grand National Series championship.  Baker won the championship with 10,716 points over second place driver Marvin Panch (9,956), and Speedy Thompson (8,560).  Baker was the first driver to win back-to-back NASCAR championships.  Baker accumulated $30,764 for his efforts in the 1957 NASCAR season.

This was the last season until the 1993 season without Richard Petty.

Overview 
In February 1957 the first '57 Chevy, affectionately known as the 'Black Widow' made its debut in NASCAR at the Daytona Beach and Road Course.  Throughout the year drivers Buck Baker, Marvin Panch, Fireball Roberts, Larry Frank, Speedy Thompson, and Bob Welborn would pilot these now classic vehicles.

Early in the 1957 season the Automobile Manufacturers Association (AMA) stated that its members should become less involved in motor sports.  After an incident in the May 20 Virginia 500 at Martinsville Speedway that injured five spectators, including a young boy, ended the race with 59 laps remaining, Ford, General Motors and Chrysler became less passionate about providing financial and administrative support for the teams. On June 6 the auto manufactures withdrew their backing from the sport. Late in the season at the North Wilkesboro Speedway, a wheel from driver Tiny Lund's car was thrown into stands, and a spectator was killed.  (There were no wheel tethers installed in NASCAR until a series of open wheel racing fatalities in the late 1990s at Michigan and Charlotte from wheels hurled into stands from crashes.)

On November 27, 1957, construction began on a new race track now known as Daytona International Speedway after five years of negations.  The ground-breaking ceremony takes place one month to the day after Buck Baker wins the final event of the season at Central Carolina Fairgrounds in Greensboro, N.C; thus securing his second consecutive championship.

Season recap 
The 1957 season opened at the Willow Springs Speedway in Lancaster, California.  Marvin Panch won the event, and followed that with a second consecutive win at the following event at the Concord Speedway late in 1956.  Fireball Roberts, Cotton Owens, Jack Smith, and Ralph Moody all notched wins during the next four events before Buck Baker took his first trip to victory lane at Hillsboro, North Carolina in March 1957.

On February 17 Pontiac gathered its first-ever NASCAR win at Daytona Beach with Cotton Owens at the wheel.  In May, a scheduled 500 lap race at Martinsville Speedway was halted after 441 circuits due to a crash.  On June 6 all factory supported teams disbanded as American auto manufactures withdrew their support from NASCAR.

During the Eighth Annual Southern 500 on September 2, driver Bobby Myers was killed in a crash on lap 28 at Darlington Raceway.  Speedy Thompson went on to win that first race to average over 100 mph at the track.  On October 12, 1957 Fireball Roberts won a 100-mile race at Newberry Speedway; and the event holds the dubious distinction of having the smallest crowd in NASCAR history as only 900 spectators looked on.

When the season had ended, 18 drivers had won at least one Grand National event.

The AMA: All in, and all out. 
The 50s can be seen as the building blocks of NASCAR.  Automobile speeds increased at a rapid rate, and an example of that can be seen in the events at the Daytona Beach road course.  The inaugural 1952 event had a pole speed of 64.7 mph, and by the final event 4 years later in 1956, the speed had risen to a blazing 81 mph.  The horsepower race was in full swing, but the leaders of the AMA had concerns.  Rising speeds on the track meant higher speeds on the nation's highways; and the fatality rate of America's public was on the rise.  NASCAR attempted to appease the AMA, and disallowed the use of superchargers and fuel injection in their sanctioned events.  NASCAR also refused to allow the Detroit manufactures to use their race results with media advertisements.  Still, the major auto manufactures continued to invest time and money in NASCAR.
Detroit auto manufactures saw NASCAR as a big business opportunity, and by the beginning of the 1957 season , GM, Ford, Mercury, and Plymouth were all backing one team or another.  Press agents were hired, and people worked to increase publicity through newspapers, radio, tv and other media venues.  It all came to a halt on May 19, 1957, when a race accident injured not just drivers, but spectators as well.  Included in the injuries was an 8 year old boy, Alvia Helsabeck.  Driver Billy Myers crashed his Mercury through the Martinsville Speedway fence during the Virginia 500, and landed in an area marked "off limits" to spectators, and young Helsabeck lost his life. Myers had been trying to lap Tom Pistone when the two cars tangled on lap 441.  Four other fans in the "No Spectators Allowed" area ages 19 to 44 were also injured.  The race was red flagged, and Buck Baker was called the winner.  As ambulances transported the injured to local hospitals, the weather turned to rain.
On June 6 the AMA leadership voted unanimously to withdraw all auto manufacture support, not just from the NASCAR Grand National series, but from all forms of auto racing.  Factory sponsored teams were eliminated, and the equipment given to the individual owners and drivers.

1957 final standings 

references

Race results

References

Bibliography 
 
 
 

 
NASCAR Cup Series seasons